Milly is a former commune in the Manche department in Normandy in north-western France. On 1 January 2016, it was merged into the new commune of Grandparigny. Its population was 327 in 2019.

See also
Communes of the Manche department

References 

Former communes of Manche
Manche communes articles needing translation from French Wikipedia